Spermo is a genus of moths in the family Geometridae.

References
Natural History Museum Lepidoptera genus database

Geometridae
Geometridae genera